In enzymology, a nicotinate-nucleotide-dimethylbenzimidazole phosphoribosyltransferase is an enzyme that catalyzes the chemical reaction

beta-nicotinate D-ribonucleotide + 5,6-dimethylbenzimidazole  nicotinate + alpha-ribazole 5'-phosphate

Thus, the two substrates of this enzyme are beta-nicotinate D-ribonucleotide and 5,6-dimethylbenzimidazole, whereas its two products are nicotinate and alpha-ribazole 5'-phosphate.

This enzyme belongs to the family of glycosyltransferases, specifically the pentosyltransferases.  The systematic name of this enzyme class is nicotinate-nucleotide:5,6-dimethylbenzimidazole phospho-D-ribosyltransferase. Other names in common use include CobT, nicotinate mononucleotide-dimethylbenzimidazole phosphoribosyltransferase, nicotinate ribonucleotide:benzimidazole (adenine) phosphoribosyltransferase, nicotinate-nucleotide:dimethylbenzimidazole phospho-D-ribosyltransferase, and nicotinate mononucleotide (NaMN):5,6-dimethylbenzimidazole phosphoribosyltransferase. This enzyme is part of the biosynthetic pathway to cobalamin (vitamin B12) in bacteria.

Function

This enzyme plays a central role in the synthesis of alpha-ribazole-5'-phosphate, an intermediate for the lower ligand of cobalamin. It is one of the enzymes of the anaerobic pathway of cobalamin biosynthesis, and one of the four proteins (CobU, CobT, CobC, and CobS) involved in the synthesis of the lower ligand and the assembly of the nucleotide loop.

Biosynthesis of cobalamin

Vitamin B12 (cobalamin) is used as a cofactor in a number of enzyme-catalysed reactions in bacteria, archaea and eukaryotes. The biosynthetic pathway to adenosylcobalamin from its five-carbon precursor, 5-aminolaevulinic acid, can be divided into three sections: (1) the biosynthesis of uroporphyrinogen III from 5-aminolaevulinic acid; (2) the conversion of uroporphyrinogen III into the ring-contracted, deacylated intermediate precorrin 6 or cobalt-precorrin 6; and (3) the transformation of this intermediate to form adenosylcobalamin. Cobalamin is synthesised by bacteria and archaea via two alternative routes that differ primarily in the steps of section 2 that lead to the contraction of the macrocycle and excision of the extruded carbon molecule (and its attached methyl group). One pathway (exemplified by Pseudomonas denitrificans) incorporates molecular oxygen into the macrocycle as a prerequisite to ring contraction, and has consequently been termed the aerobic pathway. The alternative, anaerobic, route (exemplified by Salmonella typhimurium) takes advantage of a chelated cobalt ion, in the absence of oxygen, to set the stage for ring contraction.

Structural studies

References

Further reading
 
 
 
 
 
 

Protein domains
EC 2.4.2
Enzymes of known structure